Dimitri Andreevich Pätzold (born February 3, 1983) is a Kazakh-born German professional ice hockey goaltender currently playing for EV Landshut of the DEL2. He has also played in the Kontinental Hockey League. Due to his Russian German descent he also holds Russian citizenship. Internationally Pätzold has represented the German national team at several tournaments, including the 2010 Winter Olympics.

Playing career
Pätzold was drafted 107th overall in the 2001 NHL Entry Draft by the San Jose Sharks. His previous professional teams include Kölner Haie, Adler Mannheim, the San Jose Sharks (with their AHL teams the Cleveland Barons and later the Worcester Sharks), ERC Ingolstadt, and the Straubing Tigers. 

After playing with the Straubing Tigers, Pätzold signed a contract with the Hannover Scorpions on April 12, 2011. With the forfeit of the Scorpions' DEL license two years later, Pätzold stayed in the DEL by joining the newcomer Schwenninger Wild Wings on August 5, 2013.

International play
Pätzold has played for the German national team at multiple tournaments, both at the junior and senior level. At the senior level he has played in the 2007, 2008, 2009, 2011 World Championships, and the 2010 Winter Olympics.

Career statistics

Regular season and playoffs

International

References

External links

1983 births
Living people
Adler Mannheim players
Cleveland Barons (2001–2006) players
ERC Ingolstadt players
Fresno Falcons players
German ice hockey goaltenders
Hannover Scorpions players
Ice hockey players at the 2010 Winter Olympics
Johnstown Chiefs players
Kazakhstani emigrants to Germany
Kölner Haie players
Krefeld Pinguine players
Olympic ice hockey players of Germany
Russian and Soviet-German people
San Jose Sharks draft picks
San Jose Sharks players
Schwenninger Wild Wings players
Straubing Tigers players
Worcester Sharks players
Sportspeople from Oskemen